The Yong River is a river of China, located in Nanning, Guangxi Zhuang Autonomous Region. It joins into the Yu River and flows into the South China Sea.

See also
Yong River in Zhejiang
List of rivers in China

Rivers of Guangxi
Tributaries of the Pearl River (China)